Kyiv University usually refers to the historic university founded in Kiev in 1834 whose current full name is the National Taras Shevchenko University of Kyiv. 

Many other institutions of higher education in Kiev are currently called Universities while they have been mostly known under their historic names. 
 National University of Kyiv-Mohyla Academy
 National Technical University of Ukraine Kyiv Polytechnic Institute
 Kyiv National Economic University
 Kyiv National University of Construction and Architecture
 Kyiv International University
 Borys Grinchenko Kyiv University
 Kyiv National University of Trade and Economics